Shubhendu, or Subhendu, is a male given name used most often in eastern India among Bengalis, Odias, Assamese, and other groups. The name derives from two words: "s(h)ubh", meaning "blessed", and "indu", meaning "moon". The feminine form of this name is Shubheksha.

Indian masculine given names

References